Un gars, une fille (A Guy, A Girl) is a French comedy television series created by Isabelle Camus and Hélène Jacques, based on the eponymous 1997 Quebec TV series. It stars Jean Dujardin and Alexandra Lamy, who met during the audition for the series, and started a real-life relationship during the last year of the show. Its format was a series of 7-minute-long episodes depicting the daily lives and conflicts of a couple named Jean and Alex (like their real-name counterparts), nicknamed "Loulou" and "Chouchou". It ran from 1999 to 2003.

A cult series in France, the series was highly successful, gathering 5 million viewers each day, or a third of the people watching television during that time slot. A 2001 two-parter Christmas special garnered a 27.4% market share (approximately 6 million people); the New Year's special 25%. The programme won a Sept d'or award for best entertainment show in 2001.

Dujardin and Lamy met during their audition for the series; subsequently, like their characters, they fell in love during production. Un gars, Une fille consists of 5 seasons for a total of 486 episodes. Dujardin and Lamy also reprised their roles in "À Paris", a 1999 episode of the original series set in Paris.

Production and concept 
Each episode of the series comprises a series of sketches, each sketch being filmed in a single, steady shot. Many scenes feature only Dujardin and Lamy, but some include supporting characters (such as friends, or Alex's mother; or occasional famous guests), who appear either in the background or with their faces out of shot.

References

External links 
 

1999 French television series debuts
2003 French television series endings
France Télévisions television comedy